Kateřina Pospíšilová (born 2 May 1983) is a Czech  model, actress and first runner-up of Miss Czech Republic 2006, and her country's representative at Miss International 2006 in China and Japan.

Modeling and acting career
Pospisilova was born in Prague, Czech Republic. From an early age, she was doing voice-overs for many international movies and TV series. She studied music-drama department at the prestigious Prague Conservatory. At the age of 19 Katerina joined Elite Model management who had sent her for her first contract to Korea. Many countries followed. At the age of 22 she returned to Prague, the Czech Republic where she participated in the Miss Czech Republic and became 1st runner-up, 2nd after Miss World 2006, Tatana Kucharova.

At the same time, Pospíšilová landed a role Nada Mazlova in one of the TV series, Ordinace v Ruzove zahrade.

During her modelling career,  Pospíšilová has been featured in several magazines including Esquire, Elle, Elele and worked with well known fashion designers and photographers including Simon Upton, Russel Wong and Lucie Robinson.

Personal life
Pospíšilová always claimed that she wanted to be able to support the arts. In 2006, Pospíšilová became the brand ambassador for a non-profit organization E-moc-e that supports artists in the Czech Republic. E-moc-e has enabled over 100 artists to exhibit their artwork in local galleries as well as in an online gallery. Since 2011 Pospíšilová has lived in London, United Kingdom where she has worked in art & interior design industry for international design brands including Lasvit, Harlequin London and Original BTC before starting her passion project at COSHAMIE.

Pospíšilová is married to Xavier Daza, a founding member of the indie rock band equape.

Filmography
TV, film and radio
Dokonalý svet / TV series / 2010 
Dobrá ctvrt / TV Series / 2008 
Nemocnice na kraji mesta /
O uloupené divožence / Fairytale
Trapasy / TV Movie /
Bestiár / TV Movie /
3+1 s Miroslavem Donutilem
Ordinace v ruzové zahrade / TV series / 2006 - 2008
Trapasy (TV Series) 2007 
Ranc U Zelené sedmy (TV Series) 2005 
Sotto Falso Nome
P.F. 77 / TV Movie / 2003
Vana / TV Movie / 2003

References

External links

Living people
Czech female models
Actresses from Prague
1983 births
Models from Prague